The Ufa electoral district was a constituency created for the 1917 Russian Constituent Assembly election.

The electoral district covered the Ufa Governorate. Ufa was a multinational constituency. List 1, the 'Federalists-Bashkirs' (fielded by the Ufa Governorate Secretariat of the Bashkir Central Council), was headed by Ahmet-Zaki Ahmetšachovič Validov. The SR list was dominated by leftist elements.>

In the Ust-Katav volost (hosting the Ust-Katav Wagon-Building Plant), out of 5,062 votes cast, 4,222 votes went to the Bolshevik list and 750 to the SR list. In the Zlatoust uezd, the Bashkir Federalist list obtained 58.2% of the vote, in the Sterlitamak uezd they obtained 50.8% of the vote.

Results

References

Electoral districts of the Russian Constituent Assembly election, 1917